Anthony Velona (November 16, 1920 – January 31, 1986) was an American author, lyricist, and composer. Velona was born in Jersey City, New Jersey.

He wrote or co-wrote numerous songs including the 1955 hit Domani, the 1962 hit Lollipops and Roses, and the 1966 hit Music to Watch Girls By.

References

1920 births
1986 deaths
American lyricists
American male composers
Musicians from New Jersey
20th-century American male writers
20th-century American male musicians